IFAF Flag Football World Championship is the international championship in flag football, organized by International Federation of American Football. The men's and women's competitions are usually held in the same venue. The tournament starts with pool play to fill in the seeding and follows an elimination-style of play after that. At the end of the tournament the top teams are rewarded with Bronze (3rd), Silver (2nd) or Gold (1st). The IFAF Flag Football World Championship is held every two years in different countries.

Due of Covid 19, the 2020 championships in Denmark were cancelled. The championship was rescheduled for 2021 in Jerusalem from December 6 to 8, with a record 42 teams featured, double that competing at the 2018 event in Panama. The top seven teams at the event, not including the United States, will qualify for the Birmingham 2022 World Games.

The first championships were held in Toronto, Canada in 2000 and was won by Australia.

2024 Championships to be held in Lahti, Finland

Men

Medal table

Women

Medal table

References

External links 
 International Federation of American Football IFAF
 Flag Football World Championship 2014

IFAF competitions
Flag football
Flag
Recurring sporting events established in 2002